André Roy (born February 8, 1975) is an American-born Canadian former professional ice hockey player who played in the National Hockey League (NHL).

Playing career
Roy was born in Port Chester, New York. As a youth, he played in the 1989 Quebec International Pee-Wee Hockey Tournament with a minor ice hockey team from Montreal. Roy played junior ice hockey in the Quebec Major Junior Hockey League.

Roy was drafted by the Boston Bruins, 151st overall in the sixth round of the 1994 NHL Entry Draft and has also played for the Ottawa Senators, the Tampa Bay Lightning (where he won the Stanley Cup in 2004), the Pittsburgh Penguins and the Calgary Flames. During the 2006–07 season, Roy was placed on waivers by the Penguins and claimed by the Lightning, where he was a popular, though seldom used, enforcer. His toughness, however, brought about consequences for his actions.

Controversies
On April 2, 2002, Roy received a combined 13-game suspension by the NHL, after prematurely exiting the penalty box and assaulting a linesman the previous night, amid a loss against his hometown New York Rangers. With only seven games remaining that season, the suspension carried over into the first six games of the 2002-2003 season.

Roy was ultimately removed from the Tampa Bay Lightning official roster, after a fallout with then-coach John Tortorella. In an away game against the Philadelphia Flyers, Roy fought Riley Cote twice. After being knocked down from a punch in the latter fight, Roy made a "slash throat" hand gesture toward Cote while on the bench. Tortorella had to physically remove Roy from the bench. For the remainder of the 2007–08 season (about 15 games), Roy was a healthy scratch. On July 20, 2008, Roy signed with the Calgary Flames.

In February 2009, Los Angeles Kings general manager Dean Lombardi attracted skepticism by singling out Roy as a "one-dimensional player." Said Lombardi, "So who's the one-dimensional player? André Roy from Calgary, maybe. They dressed him the other night. He's a battleship. He played, what, two minutes? So, okay, there's one, but I'd like to know how many of those guys there really are."

Personal life
Roy has two brothers, Marc and Kevin. Although born in Port Chester, New York, he was raised in Saint-Jérôme, Quebec and speaks fluent Canadian French. After winning the Stanley Cup in 2004, Roy used his day with the Cup to present an engagement ring to his future wife. They married on July 23, 2005 and have a daughter.

Career statistics

Regular season and playoffs

References

External links
 

1975 births
Living people
American men's ice hockey left wingers
Beauport Harfangs players
Boston Bruins draft picks
Boston Bruins players
Calgary Flames players
Canadian ice hockey left wingers
Chicoutimi Saguenéens (QMJHL) players
Drummondville Voltigeurs players
Ice hockey players from New York (state)
Ice hockey people from Quebec
Ottawa Senators players
People from Port Chester, New York
People from Saint-Jérôme
Pittsburgh Penguins players
Stanley Cup champions
Tampa Bay Lightning players